Pawati may refer to:
Pawati, Cameroon
Pawati, Nepal